Johnny Banco is a 1967 comedy crime film directed by Yves Allégret and starring Horst Buchholz, Sylva Koscina and Michel de Ré. It was made as a co-production between France, Italy and West Germany.

It was shot at the Victorine Studios in Nice. The film's sets were designed by Jean d'Eaubonne.

Cast
 Horst Buchholz as Johnny Banco  
 Sylva Koscina as Laureen Moore  
 Michel de Ré as Orso Sebastiani  
 Jean Parédès as L'Anchois  
 Fée Calderon as Mignon de Brandy  
 Elisabeth Wiener as Nati  
 Luciana Vincenzi as Berthe  
 Friedrich Joloff as Aristopoulos  
 Romain Bouteille as L'Éveillée  
 Walter Giller as Inspector Jakubowski

References

Bibliography 
 Bock, Hans-Michael & Bergfelder, Tim. The Concise Cinegraph: Encyclopaedia of German Cinema. Berghahn Books, 2009.

External links 
 

1967 films
1960s crime comedy films
German crime comedy films
West German films
1960s French-language films
Films directed by Yves Allégret
Italian crime comedy films
French crime comedy films
Constantin Film films
Films set in Monaco
1967 comedy films
Films shot at Victorine Studios
Films with screenplays by Michel Audiard
1960s French films
1960s Italian films
1960s German films